Anshuman Vichare (born 1975) is a Mumbai-based actor, director, producer, and television personality.

Awards

"Best Actor" in Intercollegiate Competitions Gokhale Utsav, Shankar Narayan College
 Marathi Lokanatya Competition Shrikrishna Pendya
 Mono Acting Competition at Dhuru Hall Dadar
 One act play "Fantasy"
 Mira-Bhayander Competition
 V.Shantaram Competition at Lower Parel
 Intercollegiate Competition "Chakawa"
 Interuniversity "Competition Salam Karo Salam"
 Astitwa Competition Dental College
 Open Competition at Chikhal Wadi " Tax Free"
 Utsfurt Competition "Pratikriya"
 Hindi One-act plays for IPTA: Jaljala, Bali, Sati, Salam Karo Salam
 Kala Niketanís award for Best Supporting Actor for T.V. Serial  Awad Aapli Aapli
 Winner of  Reality Show Fu Bai Fu Season 2
 Sanskruti  Kala Darpan Award for his role in Hungama

He made his film debut in a character role in an Oscar-Nominated Marathi Movie Shwaas.

Vichare also worked as an assistant director and has done anchoring for various televised shows.

Career

Filmography

Television

Theatre

Anchoring

Assistant Director - Documentaries

Assistant Director - Theatre

References

 http://timesofindia.indiatimes.com/entertainment/marathi/Hollywood-enters-Marathi-industry/articleshow/46378418.cms?from=mdr
 http://timesofindia.indiatimes.com/entertainment/marathi/movie-reviews/sangharsh/movie-review/30002378.cms?from=mdr
 http://timesofindia.indiatimes.com/entertainment/marathi/movies/news/Milind-Kavdes-new-movie-unveiled/articleshow/47147147.cms?from=mdr
 http://timesofindia.indiatimes.com/tv/news/marathi/-Satara-gets-a-high-dose-of-comedy/articleshow/55527761.cms?from=mdr
 http://timesofindia.indiatimes.com/tv/trade-news/marathi/-Renuka-Shahane-says-alvida-to-Comedychi-Bullet-Train/articleshow/53503941.cms?from=mdr
 http://timesofindia.indiatimes.com/entertainment/marathi/movies/Small-budget-films-with-big-budget-item-numbers/Small-budget-films-with-big-budget-item-numbers/photostory/36313101.cms
 https://megamarathi.com/marathi-movies/well-done-bhalya-2016-marathi-movie/
 https://wn.com/mobile/mi_marathi_khau_galli
 http://www.zeetalkies.com/reviews/partu-movie-review.html
 http://thepunekar.com/2014/08/movie-review-poshter-boyz/

Male actors from Mumbai
Indian documentary film directors
Film producers from Mumbai
Film directors from Mumbai
Indian male television actors
Male actors in Marathi cinema
1975 births
Living people
Male actors in Marathi television